Haueisen is a German surname. Notable people with the surname include:
 
 Lutz Haueisen (born 1956), German amateur cyclist
 Dennis Haueisen (born 1978), German professional cyclist, son of Lutz

German-language surnames